The 2018–19 Chattanooga Mocs women's basketball team represented the University of Tennessee at Chattanooga during the 2018–19 NCAA Division I women's basketball season. The Mocs, led by first-year head coach Katie Burrows, played their home games at the McKenzie Arena as members of the Southern Conference (SoCon). The Mocs finished the season 14–17, 8–6 in third place in the SoCon, losing to Furman in the quarterfinals of the conference tournament.

Previous season
The 2017–18 Chattanooga Mocs women's basketball team represented the University of Tennessee at Chattanooga during the 2017–18 NCAA Division I women's basketball season. The Mocs, led by fifth-year head coach Jim Foster, played their home games at the McKenzie Arena as members of the Southern Conference (SoCon). The Mocs finished the season 17–13, 8–6 in third place in the SoCon, losing to UNC Greensboro in the conference tournament. They received an at-large berth in the 2018 WNIT but lost in the first round to UAB. Foster retired soon afterwards.

Schedule
 
|-
!colspan=9 style="background:#00386B; color:#E0AA0F;"| Regular Season
|-

|-
!colspan=9 style="background:#00386B; color:#E0AA0F;"| SoCon Regular Season
|-

|-
!colspan=9 style="background:#00386B; color:#E0AA0F;"| SoCon Tournament

References

Chattanooga Mocs women's basketball seasons
Chattanooga